The 2016 ECAC Hockey Men's Ice Hockey Tournament is the 55th tournament in league history. It was played between March 4 and March 19, 2016. First Round and Quarterfinal games were played at home team campus sites, while the final four games were played at the Herb Brooks Arena in Lake Placid, New York. By winning the tournament, the team receives the ECAC's automatic bid to the 2016 NCAA Division I Men's Ice Hockey Tournament.

Format
The tournament features four rounds of play. The teams that finish above fifth place in the standings receive a bye to the quarterfinal round. In the first round, the fifth and twelfth seeds, the sixth and eleventh seeds, the seventh and tenth seeds and the eighth and ninth seeds played a best-of-three series with the winners advancing to the quarterfinals. In the quarterfinals the one seed plays the lowest remaining seed, the second seed plays the second-lowest remaining seed, the third seed plays the third-lowest remaining seed and the fourth seed plays the fourth-lowest remaining seed another best-of-three series with the winners of these the series advancing to the Semifinals. In the semifinals the top remaining seed plays the lowest remaining seed while the two remaining teams play against each other. The winners of the semifinals play in the championship game, and no third-place game is played. All series after the quarterfinals are single-elimination games. The tournament champion receives an automatic bid to the 2016 NCAA Division I Men's Ice Hockey Tournament.

Conference standings
Note: GP = Games played; W = Wins; L = Losses; T = Ties; PTS = Points; GF = Goals For; GA = Goals Against

Bracket
Teams are reseeded after the First Round and Quarterfinals

Note: * denotes overtime period(s)

Results

First round

(5) Clarkson vs. (12) Princeton

(6) Rensselaer vs. (11) Brown

(7) Dartmouth vs. (10) Colgate

(8) Cornell vs. (9) Union

Quarterfinals

(1) Quinnipiac vs. (8) Cornell

(2) Yale vs. (7) Dartmouth

(3) Harvard vs. (6) Rensselaer

(4) St. Lawrence vs. (5) Clarkson

Semifinals

(1) Quinnipiac vs. (7) Dartmouth

(3) Harvard vs. (4) St. Lawrence

Championship

(1) Quinnipiac vs. (3) Harvard

Tournament awards

All-Tournament Team
F Travis St. Denis (Quinnipiac)
F Landon Smith (Quinnipiac)
F Jimmy Vesey (Harvard)
D Connor Clifton* (Quinnipiac)
D Gavin Bayreuther (St. Lawrence)
G Michael Garteig (Quinnipiac)
* Most Outstanding Player(s)

Media

Television
ASN had the television rights to semifinals and championship game during the tournament.

Broadcast Assignments
Semifinals & Championship
Eric Frede & Colby Cohen

Streaming
Every game during the tournament was streamed through the ECAC Hockey's website.

References

ECAC Tournament
ECAC Hockey Men's Ice Hockey Tournament
Sports in Lake Placid, New York
Ice hockey in New York (state)
College sports in New York (state)
ECAC Hockey Men's Ice Hockey